Hristos Polihroniou (also Christos Polychroniou, born March 31, 1972) is retired a Greek hammer thrower.

He was born in Athens.

His personal best throw is 80.08 metres, achieved in April 2002 in Athens. This ranks him second among Greek hammer throwers, only behind Alexandros Papadimitriou.

Doping
He was suspended by the IAAF from May 2005 to May 2007, after he'd tested positive for clomiphene. In 2008 he was found guilty of refusal to submit to doping control, and received a life ban.

Honours

References

1972 births
Living people
Greek male hammer throwers
Olympic athletes of Greece
Athletes (track and field) at the 1996 Summer Olympics
Athletes (track and field) at the 2000 Summer Olympics
Athletes from Athens
Doping cases in athletics
Greek sportspeople in doping cases
World Athletics Championships athletes for Greece
Olympiacos Athletics athletes
Panathinaikos Athletics
Universiade medalists in athletics (track and field)
Universiade silver medalists for Greece